Vomp is a municipality in the Schwaz district in the Austrian state of Tyrol.

Population

See also 
 St. Georgenberg-Fiecht Abbey

References

Cities and towns in Schwaz District